Shetou is a railway station on the Taiwan Railways Administration West Coast line located in Shetou Township, Changhua County, Taiwan.

Around the station
 Shetou Doushan Temple
 THSR Changhua Station

See also
 List of railway stations in Taiwan

References

External links 

1905 establishments in Taiwan
Railway stations in Changhua County
Railway stations served by Taiwan Railways Administration